The Sun of May is a national emblem of Argentina and Uruguay, and appears on the flags of both countries.


History 

According to Diego Abad de Santillán, the Sun of May represents Inti, the Incan god of the sun.

The specification "of May" is a reference to the May Revolution which took place in the week from 18 to 25 May 1810, which marked the beginning of the independence from the Spanish Empire for the countries that were then part of the Viceroyalty of the Río de la Plata. A legend claims that as the new government was proclaimed, the sun broke through the clouds, which was seen as a good omen.

Variations 
In the flag of Argentina, the Sun of May is the radiant golden yellow sun bearing the human face and thirty-two rays that alternate between sixteen straight and sixteen wavy.

In the flag of Uruguay, the Sun of May is the golden yellow sun bearing the human face and sixteen triangular rays that alternate between eight straight and eight wavy.

Inspired by the Latin American wars of independence, the Philippines, which was a fellow former Spanish colony, also adopted the Sun of May as a revolutionary banner.

Description 
The sun, called the Sun of May, is a replica of an engraving on the first Argentine coin, approved in 1813 by the Constituent Assembly, whose value was eight  (one Spanish dollar).

In form, it is similar to—and may be partially derived from—the sun in splendour, which is common in European heraldry. This, too, is usually depicted with a face, and with alternating straight and wavy rays (representing light and heat respectively), though it normally has only sixteen rays.

See also 
 inti
 Sun (heraldry)
 Solar symbol
 Vergina Sun

References

External links 

National symbols of Argentina
National symbols of Uruguay
Heraldic charges
Coats of arms with suns
Inca gods
Solar symbols